Jackson Lee (born September 6, 2002) is an American racing driver. He currently competes in the U.S. F2000 National Championship with Cape Motorsports.

Racing record

Career summary 

* Season still in progress.

American open-wheel racing results

U.S. F2000 National Championship 
(key) (Races in bold indicate pole position) (Races in italics indicate fastest lap) (Races with * indicate most race laps led)

* Season still in progress.

References 

2002 births
Living people
Racing drivers from Indiana
Racing drivers from Indianapolis
Formula Ford drivers
U.S. F2000 National Championship drivers